Sigma Lambda Chi is a scholastic honor society that recognizes academic achievement among students in the field of construction management.

The society was founded at Michigan State University on April 30, 1949, and admitted to the Association of College Honor Societies in 1991.

Sigma Lambda Chi honor society has 66 active chapters, and a total membership of approximately 25,000.

See also
 Association of College Honor Societies

References

External links
 
  ACHS Sigma Lambda Chi entry
 Sigma Lambda Chi chapter list at ACHS

Association of College Honor Societies
Honor societies
Student organizations established in 1949
1949 establishments in Michigan